BG Personal Bodyguard (Japanese: 身辺警護人, BG Shinpen Keigonin) is a Japanese television crime drama series starring Takuya Kimura and written by Yumiko Inoue. It aired first in January 2018 on TV Asahi. The second season was originally to start running in April 2020, however was delayed till 18 June 2020.

Synopsis
Shimazaki Akira is divorced and lives with his teenage son. He used to work as a personal bodyguard but had since left the industry after an accident occurred in which his soccer superstar client was injured. He now works as a security guard at a construction site. The private security company (Hinode Security Service/HSS) he works for is setting up a new bodyguard division. Without telling his manager about the past, Akira Shimazaki starts working as a novice bodyguard.

Broadcast
The first episode was broadcast on January 18, 2018, in Japan. It was also aired at the same month by Wakuwaku Japan in several Asian countries including Indonesia, Mongolia, Myanmar, Singapore, Sri Lanka and Taiwan. The first episode received a viewer rating of 15.7%.

Cast

Special appearances
Tomoko Yamaguchi, who previously appeared alongside Takuya Kimura in the 1996 drama Long Vacation, appears in season 1 episodes 6 and 7 as the ex-wife of Akira Shimazaki.

Nene Otsuka, who previously appeared alongside Takuya Kimura in the 2001 drama Hero (2001 TV series), appears in season 1 episode 2.

Masanobu Katsumura, who previously appeared alongside Takuya Kimura in the 2001 drama Hero (2001 TV series), appears in season 2.

References

External links
 Official website in Japanese
 BG Personal Bodyguard on IMDB

Japanese drama television series
TV Asahi television dramas
2018 Japanese television series debuts
2018 Japanese television series endings
Television productions suspended due to the COVID-19 pandemic
Television productions postponed due to the COVID-19 pandemic
2020 Japanese television series debuts
2020 Japanese television series endings